The , formerly known as the Yokohama Broadcasting Technical School, is a Japanese film school and university. It was founded in 1975 by film director Shohei Imamura.

While a student at this school, director Takashi Miike was given his first film credit, as assistant director on Imamura's 1987 film Zegen.

, the current president is Tadao Sato.

Notable alumni
Hito Steyerl
Kim Eung-soo
Kiyoshi Sasabe
Takashi Miike
Teruyoshi Uchimura
Tetsurō Degawa
Bakarhythm
Eiko Kano
Kosaka Daimaou
Kotaro Tanaka

See also
Haruhiko Arai

References

External links

Film schools in Japan
Private universities and colleges in Japan
Universities and colleges in Kanagawa Prefecture
Kawasaki, Kanagawa
Educational institutions established in 1975
1975 establishments in Japan